= Green Faces, Burnt Bodies =

- Directed by: Mahmoud Shoolizadeh
- Produced by: Mahmoud Shoolizadeh
- Release date: 1985
- Running time: 17 minutes
- Country: Iran

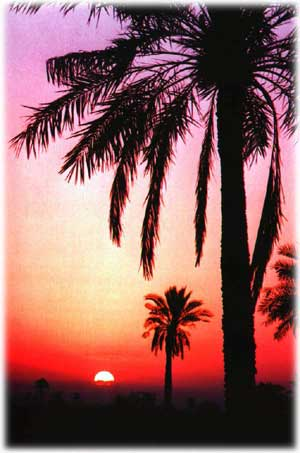
Date palm trees in Iran at sunset. Iran was one of the largest producers of dates in the world. But with the destruction of these trees, production has decreased a lot.

Green faces, Burnt bodies is a film by Mahmoud Shoolizadeh about the life and death of trees during wars.

In the film, cutting trees and their branches, perforating the trunk and eradicating the trees are shown dramatically during the war invasion against Iran. In the war, the trees and nature would be damaged too, and the death and life process would be enhanced in all dimensions. In the end, the green leaves of the plant shoot out and once again the trees blossom and life begins.

This film participated in:

- Youth Short Film Festival in Iran and became candidate for the best documentary, 1985,
- Holy Defence Film Festival in Tehran, Iran, 1986

== Technical specifications and Film crew ==
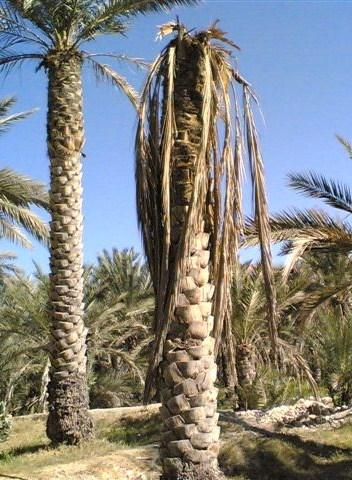
Millions of Date palm trees existed in southern Iran, which were mostly destroyed along with other types of trees due to war with Iraq, between 1980 and 1988

Green faces, Burnt bodies

- 16mm, 17min, Documentary, Iran, 1985
- Director: Mahmoud Shoolizadeh
- Script writer: Aliakbar Booghalami,
- Photograph: Morteza Hajmoradi,
- Edit: Esfandyar Habib nejad,
- Producer: Mahmoud Shoolizadeh (University of TV & Radio, Iran)
